WIFE is the solo project of Irish musician and singer James Kelly, formerly of the group Altar of Plagues. The first WIFE single was released in October 2012 when Pitchfork premiered "Bodies".

The debut WIFE album, What's Between, was released on Tri Angle in June 2014 and featured additional production from The Haxan Cloak and Roly Porter.  The video for lead single "Heart is a Far Light" was released in July 2014.

Kelly participated in the 2014 edition of the Red Bull Music Academy, which took place in Tokyo, Japan.

Early life and education
Kelly grew up in the village of Ballinhassig. He studied environmental science at University College Cork and gained a masters in Conservation at University College London.

Touring
In 2014, WIFE made its debut in the United States, performing at Decibel Festival in Seattle as well as in New York, Los Angeles, San Francisco and Philadelphia. WIFE has toured with the acts Zola Jesus and Liars. In September 2016, WIFE will tour with Animal Collective. In 2016 WIFE embarked on a month long European tour with Oathbreaker (band). WIFE has performed at Sónar editions in Barcelona (2015)  and Reykjavík (2016)

Further Musical Work
In 2014, WIFE remixed The Dillinger Escape Plan single "One of Us is the Killer". In 2015, WIFE co-wrote and co-produced the track "Waves" for Haleek Maul  In 2015, WIFE remixed AlunaGeorge single "Supernatural". Kelly co-produced the Zola Jesus single "Siphon", from the 2017 album Okovi. The single was named Best New Music by Pitchfork.

Discography
 Stoic EP (2012) Left Blank
 What's Between (2014) Tri Angle
Standard Nature(2016) [Profound Lore Records]

References

Irish musicians
Living people
Musicians from Cork (city)
Year of birth missing (living people)